Megan Ann Signal (born 17 February 1990) is a New Zealand weightlifter who qualified for the 2020 Summer Olympics in the women's 76 kg category.

Career
Signal began weightlifting in 2013 at the FS Olympic Weightlifting Club in Auckland, New Zealand, which she attributed to her CrossFit interest. She holds two Oceania records in the 71 kg class and won medals at the 2019 Pacific Games and Oceania Weightlifting Championships.

She withdrew from the Tokyo Olympics without competing, due to a shoulder injury.

Medalbox note

References

External links

1990 births
Living people
New Zealand female weightlifters
Sportspeople from Hamilton, New Zealand
Weightlifters at the 2022 Commonwealth Games
21st-century New Zealand women